2RN  is the trading name of RTÉ Transmission Network DAC, a wholly owned subsidiary of Raidió Teilifís Éireann, formerly trading as RTÉNL, which runs Ireland's principal digital terrestrial television and radio broadcast networks. In December 2002 it became an incorporated company and subsidiary of RTÉ, it was previously a division within RTÉ. It operates 12 main TV and radio transmitter sites and many smaller relays and transposers, which carry television and/or radio. It also provides site hosting for mobile telephone operators, the emergency services, wireless broadband and other private mobile communications service providers.

In April 2013 a repositioning was carried out to provide "arm's length" broadcast transmission services to all national TV and radio broadcasters. The repositioning renamed and rebranded RTÉNL to 2RN (the name comes from the original Irish Radio service known as 2RN. A new board of directors was appointed with an independent chairman and its headquarters was located in Tallaght, across the city from its owner's campus at Donnybrook in Dublin.

RTÉ NL

Carried content
Saorview is carried from all 64 TV transmitter sites.

The 4 PSB FM radio stations RTÉ Radio 1, RTÉ 2fm, RTÉ lyric fm and RTÉ Raidió na Gaeltachta are carried, although not all on every transmitter or relay,. The longwave radio transmitter carries RTÉ Radio 1 only on the 252 kHz frequency.

Commercial radio broadcaster Today FM is also carried on most main sites as well as many relays and many Independent Local Radio stations use the local 2RN transmission site.

Digital upgrades

Television: Saorview, Saorsat
2rn having built and commissioned the new digital infrastructure, is also the body responsible for day-to-day running and operating the platform providing 98% population coverage at ASO in October 2012. Broadcasting is done via DVB-T, using MPEG-4 video compression and MPEG 1 Layer II audio compression.

Saorsat will cover the remaining 2% not covered by DTT due to terrain issues using narrowband Ka satellite from June 2011. For more on these see Saorview article

RTÉ (via 2RN) are licensed by Comreg to operate and maintain 2 Public Service Broadcasting (PSB) multiplexes (or muxes) on the Saorview Digital terrestrial television service.  Both muxes are operational.

Radio
A trial DAB service was operated in three main urban areas (Dublin, Cork & Limerick) and the north-east of the country, from 4 transmitters on Multiplex 12C to approx 56% of the population.

RTÉ ceased DAB transmissions on 31 March 2021.

The Clarkestown LW transmitter is equipped for, and has been used to carry Digital Radio Mondiale transmissions in the past, but there are no public plans to continue this.

Transmission sites

Main sites for DTT and FM radio 

Cairn Hill, County Longford 
Clermont Carn, County Louth
Holywell Hill, County Donegal
Kippure, County Wicklow
Maghera, County Clare
Mount Leinster, County Carlow/County Wexford
Mullaghanish, County Cork
Spur Hill, County Cork
Three Rock, County Dublin
Truskmore, County Sligo

LW Radio 

Clarkstown, County Meath - LW Radio (Equipped for DRM)

Relay transmitters 

Achill Island, County Mayo - DTT, FM radio
Arranmore Island, County Donegal - DTT, FM radio
Arklow, County Wicklow - DTT
Athlone town, County Westmeath - FM radio,
Ballybofey, County Donegal - DTT, FM radio, 
Ballydavid, County Kerry, - FM radio
Bandon, County Cork - DTT
Bantry, County Cork - DTT, FM radio, 
Cahir, County Tipperary- DTT
Cahirciveen, County Kerry - DTT, FM radio
Casla, County Galway - DTT, FM radio
Castlebar, County Mayo - DTT, FM radio
Castletownbere, County Cork - DTT, FM radio
Clifden, County Galway - DTT, FM radio
Clonakilty, County Cork - DTT
Clonmany, County Donegal - DTT
Clonmel, County Waterford - DTT, FM Radio
Collins Barracks (Cork), County Cork - DTT, FM radio
Crosshaven, County Cork - DTT, FM radio
Dingle, County Kerry - DTT
Dooncarton (Iorras), County Mayo- DTT
Drimoleague, County Cork - DTT
Dungarvan, County Waterford - DTT, FM radio
Ennistymon, County Clare - DTT
Falcarragh, County Donegal - DTT
Ferrypoint, County Waterford (serves Youghal) - DTT
Fanad, County Donegal - DTT, FM radio
Fermoy, County Cork - DTT, FM radio
Forth Mountain, County Wexford, - DTT
Gallow's Hill, County Waterford (site serves Waterford city) - DTT, FM radio 
Glanmire, County Cork - DTT
Glencolmcille, County Donegal - DTT
Glendalough, County Wicklow - DTT
Glenties, County Donegal - DTT
Gorey, County Wexford - DTT
Greenore, County Louth - DTT
Greystones, County Wicklow - DTT, FM radio
Kilduff, County Tipperary - DTT, FM radio (carries RTÉ Radio 1 only on 90.2)
Killaloe, County Clare - DTT
Kilmacthomas, County Waterford - DTT
Knockanore, County Kerry - DTT, FM radio 
Knockmoyle, (Slieve Mish) County Kerry - DTT, FM radio
Kinsale, County Cork - DTT, FM radio
Lahinch, County Clare - FM radio
Leap, County Cork - DTT
Letterkenny, County Donegal - DTT
Maamclassach, County Kerry'' - DTT, FM radio
Magheroarty, County Donegal - DTT, FM radio
Malin Head, County Donegal - DTT, FM radio
Mitchelstown, County Cork - DTT
Monaghan, County Monaghan - DTT, FM radio
Mount Gabriel, County Cork - DTT
Moville, County Donegal - DTT, FM radio
Rosscarbery, County Cork - DTT
Suir Valley, County Kilkenny - DTT, FM radio
Timoleague, County Cork - DTT
Tonabrocky, County Galway - DTT
Woodcock Hill, County Clare - DTT, FM radio
Carslville South, CO Cork - DTT, FM

Transmitters no longer active 
Abbeyfeale, County Limerick - UHF television
Aghavannagh, County Wicklow - UHF television
Annagry, County Donegal - UHF television
Annascaul, County Kerry - UHF television
Araglin, County Cork - UHF television
Arthurstown, County Wexford - UHF television
Ashford, County Wicklow - UHF television
Ashleam, County Mayo - UHF television
Athlone (Moydrum), County Westmeath Telecommunications. Was MW radio 
Avoca, County Wicklow A - UHF television
Avoca, County Wicklow B - UHF television
Ballinastoe, County Wicklow - UHF television
Ballineen, County Cork - UHF television
Ballingeary, County Cork - UHF television
Ballinglen, County Wicklow - UHF television
Ballintrillick, County Sligo - UHF television
Ballyandreen, County Cork - UHF television
Ballymacarbry, County Waterford - UHF television
Ballynakilly, County Kerry - UHF television
Ballyporeen, County Tipperary - UHF television
Ballinure, County Cork - Telecommunications only. Was MW radio.
Bealanabrack, County Galway - UHF television
Belgooley, County Cork - UHF television
Ben Gorm, County Mayo - UHF television
Blarney, County Cork - UHF television
Bonane, County Kerry - UHF television
Briska, County Mayo - UHF television
Brittas Bay, County Wicklow - UHF television
Broadford, County Clare - UHF television
Corrnamona, County Galway - UHF television
Crossbarry, County Cork - UHF television
Donnybrook, Dublin, County Dublin - VHF television
Droumgarriff, County Cork - UHF television
Dromanassig, County Kerry - UHF television
Dunquin, County Kerry - UHF television
Dunmanway, County Cork - UHF television
Failmore, County Galway - UHF television
Glenbeigh, County Kerry - UHF television
Glencar, County Kerry - UHF television
Headford, County Kerry - UHF television
Inchigeelagh, County Cork - UHF television
Inistioge, County Kilkenny - UHF television
Kells Bay, County Kerry - UHF television
Kilkee, County Clare - UHF television
Killeagh, County Cork - UHF television
Kilmacomma, County Tipperary - UHF television
Lauragh, County Kerry - UHF television
Listowel, County Kerry - UHF television
Lomanaugh, County Kerry - UHF television
Maam, County Galway - UHF television
Macroom, County Cork - UHF television
Monasootagh, County Wexford - UHF television
Morley's Bridge, County Kerry - UHF television
Mountainstage, County Kerry - UHF television
Mulranny, County Mayo - UHF television
Nire Valley, County Waterford - UHF television
Passage West, site located at Marino, near Cobh County Cork - UHF television
Termon, County Donegal - UHF television
Tinahealy, County Wicklow - UHF television
Tomriland, County Wicklow - UHF television
Toomes Bridge, County Cork - UHF television
Tracton, County Cork - UHF television
Tullamore, County Offaly - MW Radio
Westport, County Mayo - UHF television
Woodenbridge, County Wicklow - UHF television
Youghal (south), site at The Strand, Youghal town, County Cork - UHF television

External links
Department of Communications Digital Television
DTT Network - Saorview

References

Network Limited